The Orland, Newville and Pacific Railroad is a  gauge miniature railway built to a scale of 5 inches to the foot. It is located in Orland, California, on the Glenn County Fairgrounds located on East Yolo Street. It has been operating at the same location since 1993.

See also
List of heritage railways

References

External links
Official Website
Glenn County Fairgrounds

Transportation in Glenn County, California
Tourist attractions in Glenn County, California
15 in gauge railways in the United States
1993 establishments in California